Myrciaria cordata is a species of plant in the family Myrtaceae. It is known only from two specimens from British Guiana and Rio Branco, Mato Grosso, Brazil.

References

cordata
Crops originating from the Americas
Crops originating from Brazil
Tropical fruit
Flora of South America
Endemic flora of Brazil
Fruits originating in South America
Cauliflory
Fruit trees
Berries
Plants described in 1856